Theodore of Alexandria may refer to:

 Patriarch Theodore I of Alexandria, Greek Patriarch of Alexandria in 607–609
 Pope Theodoros I of Alexandria, ruled in 730–742
 Patriarch Theodore II of Alexandria (Coadjutor), Greek Patriarch of Alexandria between the 7th and 8th centuries
 Patriarch Theodore II of Alexandria, Greek Patriarch of Alexandria since 2004
 Pope Tawadros II of Alexandria, ruled since 2012